Juan Happy Love Story is a 2016 Philippine television drama  comedy romance series broadcast by GMA Network. Directed by L.A. Madridejos, it stars Dennis Trillo and Heart Evangelista. It premiered on May 16, 2016 on the network's Telebabad line up replacing Because of You. The series concluded on September 2, 2016 with a total of 80 episodes. It was replaced by Someone to Watch Over Me in its timeslot.

The series is streaming online on YouTube.

Premise
The story revolves around Juan dela Costa and Happy. The two meet each other when Juan rescue Happy from a thief. Their romance leads to a wedding. Their relationship with their families is opposed and the couple can't have child on their own, so they decided to adopt one instead.

Cast and characters

Lead cast
 Dennis Trillo as Juan dela Costa, Jr.
 Heart Evangelista as Happy Villanueva-Dela Costa

Supporting cast
 Gloria Romero as Imelda "Mameng" Valencia-dela Costa
 Nick Lizaso as Carlos "Caloy" dela Costa
 Lotlot de Leon as Marissa "Isay" Canlas-Villanueva
 Gardo Versoza as Rodrigo "Boyong" Villanueva
 Erika Padilla as Joy Villanueva-Agustin
 Dominic Roco as Henry Agustin
 Vincent Magbanua as Lucky Villanueva
 Joross Gamboa as Robert "Bob" Agoncillo
 Kim Domingo as Agatha Samaniego
 Rob Moya as Kyle Ignacio
 Leanne Bautista as Katrina Cassandra "Katkat" Dela Costa-Arboleda

Recurring cast
 Koreen Medina as Lorraine Ignacio
 Arianne Bautista as Sahlee Perez
 Ashley Cabrera as Lenlen Villanueva Agustin
 Vince Gamad as Glenn
 Papa Dudut as Narrator / Taxi Driver / Various
 Judie dela Cruz as Michelle
 Kiel Rodriguez as Clinton
 Matet de Leon as Didit Dimalinlang
 Carla Humphries as Sabrina Moran
 Keanna Reeves as Evelyn Samaniego

Guest cast
 Mickey Ferriols as Jarina dela Costa
 Carl Acosta as young Juan
 Pauline Mendoza as teen Happy
 Sheree Bautista as Lucy
 Pen Medina as Danny
 Jinri Park as Lyla
 Arielle Arida as Maganda
 Stephanie Sol as Dorcas
 June Macasaet as Malakas
 Debbie Garcia as Pia
 Teresita Gonzales as Mrs. Cumbiado
 Rolando Inocencio as Kapitan
 Kim Last as Alex
 Mariam Al-Alawi as Ava
 Carl Cervantes as Rasul
 Faith da Silva as Adarna
 Carla Abellana as older Katkat

Ratings
According to AGB Nielsen Philippines' Mega Manila household television ratings, the pilot episode of Juan Happy Love Story earned a 17.1% rating. While the final episode scored a 17.3% rating.

References

External links
 
 

2016 Philippine television series debuts
2016 Philippine television series endings
Filipino-language television shows
GMA Network drama series
Philippine romantic comedy television series
Television shows set in Quezon City